Solenaia is a genus of freshwater mussels,  aquatic bivalve mollusks in the family Unionidae.

Distribution
Most of the species in this genus are endemic to the Yangtze River Basin of China. Additional species are found in Thailand, Northeastern India and Korea.

Species
In WoRMS there is only one species listed in this genus. On the other hand, Chinese literature sources have records of at least five different species.  The MussellP database from the University of Wisconsin - Stevens Point, list eight different species.  The list below summarizes these findings as follows:
 Solenaia carinata (Heude, 1877)
 Solenaia emarginata (Lea, 1860)
 Solenaia iridinea (Heude, 1874): Better known as Solenaia oleivora in Chinese literatures.
Solenaia khwaenoiensis Panha & Deein, 2003: Endemic to the Khwae Noi River in Thailand, the famous river in the movie The Bridge over the River Kwai.
Solenaia neotriangularis He & Zhuang, 2013
 Solenaia rivularis (Heude, 1877)
Solenaia soleniformis (Benson, 1836)
Solenaia triangularis (Heude, 1885)

References

External links

Unionidae
Bivalve genera